Rivière Témiscamie (Air Roberval Ltée) Aerodrome  is located adjacent to the Temiscamie River, Quebec, Canada. The airport is operated in the winter, usually between 15 November to 15 April.

See also
Rivière Témiscamie Water Aerodrome

References

Registered aerodromes in Nord-du-Québec